The Texas Department of Agriculture (TDA) is a state agency within the state of Texas, which is responsible for matters pertaining to agriculture, rural community affairs, and related matters. It is currently headed by Agriculture Commissioner Sid Miller, a Republican, who is seeking reelection for another term in 2022.

History

TDA was established by the 13th Texas Legislature in 1907.  TDA is headed by the Texas Agriculture Commissioner, one of four heads of state agencies which is elected by statewide ballot (and the only one where the provision for statewide election is mandated by legislative action, not enshrined in the Texas Constitution) for a four-year term, concurrent with the gubernatorial election (prior to 1978, the term was two years before a statewide amendment in 1974 extended it to four years). John C. White is the longest-serving Agriculture Commissioner in Texas history, with 26 years of service (1951–1977).

The department is headquartered on the 11th floor of the Stephen F. Austin State Office Building at 1700 North Congress Avenue in Austin.

The mission statement of the Texas Department of Agriculture is: "Partner with all Texans to make Texas the nation's leader in agriculture, fortify our economy, empower rural communities, promote healthy lifestyles, and cultivate winning strategies for rural, suburban and urban Texas through exceptional service and the common threads of agriculture in our daily lives."

Commissioners of the Texas Department of Agriculture

Milner was appointed as Commissioner prior to the first statewide election in 1908.

Divisions 
The department is divided into the following divisions:
 Administrative Services—Provides TDA support functions
 Communications—Provides media information, public information and TDA internal support services
 Financial Services—Provides TDA accounting, budgetary, and purchasing functions
 Food and Nutrition—Administers the U.S. Department of Agriculture’s School Lunch, School Breakfast, Summer and After School Snack Programs in Texas public schools, including technical assistance and training to school district child nutrition professionals to help them stay abreast of state and federal policies, as well as processing of reimbursements to schools participating in the Child Nutrition Programs
 Legal Affairs—Responsible for providing legal services and counsel to all TDA programs and divisions. Legal Affairs is also responsible for enforcement of the department's regulatory functions, including prosecutions and settlements, and is the liaison with the Texas Attorney General
 Office of Policy and External Relations—Provides support to the Commissioner and the agency by monitoring and analyzing federal and state legislative and regulatory activities that affect Texas Agricultural producers and consumers as well as studying issues that affect rural Texas; also responsible for the management of several TDA grants including the Texas Israel Exchange Program, the Urban School Agricultural Grant Program, the Surplus Food Grant Program, Enology/Viticulture Research Grants, the Leon River Restoration Project Grant and the Feral Hog Damage Abatement Program
 Marketing and Promotion—Works to increase the sales of both raw and processed Texas agricultural commodities by promoting Texas food, fiber, wine, livestock, horticulture and forestry products under the GO TEXAN campaign
 Pesticide Programs—TDA is designated as the state’s lead agency in the regulation of pesticide use and application.  The division is responsible for licensing and training pesticide applicators, overseeing worker protection, registering pesticides for sale in the state and working to minimize unnecessary impacts to agriculture while enhancing protection of endangered and threatened species as mandated by the federal law
 Regulatory Programs—TDA has a strong consumer protection program, which includes overseeing items like grocery store scales, egg quality, nursery products and gasoline pumps. TDA regularly works with producers to ensure they receive quality seed. This division also ensures the accuracy of weights and measures and protects against the movement of harmful pests into Texas
 Rural Economic Development—Assists rural communities and businesses to create and retain jobs through business development and community assistance, and through the GO TEXAN Rural Community Program, the division promotes agricultural diversification, small town revitalization and rural tourism

References

External links

 Texas Department of Agriculture

Agriculture
Agriculture in Texas
State departments of agriculture of the United States
1907 establishments in Texas
Government agencies established in 1907